Seyyedi Bazar (also Romanized as Seyyedī Bāzār) is a village in Pir Sohrab Rural District, in the Central District of Chabahar County, Sistan and Baluchestan Province, Iran. At the 2006 census, its population was 153, in 30 families.

References 

Populated places in Chabahar County